Christel Fiebiger (born 1946) is a German politician. She was a member of the Landtag of Brandenburg from 1990 to 1999, and a member of the Fifth European Parliament from 1999 to 2004.

Life
Christel Fiebiger was born on 29 December 1946 in Uenze-Brandenburg. She was an agricultural engineer before entering politics.

References

1946 births
Living people
Members of the Landtag of Brandenburg
MEPs for Germany 1999–2004
20th-century women MEPs for Germany
21st-century women MEPs for Germany